Cashbox may refer to:

 Cash register
 Safe
 Cashbox (magazine), a music industry publication, in print from 1942 to 1996